Chiapuk, also known as Copperopolis and Copperosity, is a populated place situated in Pinal County, Arizona, United States. The word Chiapuk means "spring" in the O'odham language, and the variant name Copperosity is derived from the proximity of the Copperosity Mine. During the late 1880s, the local post office was known as the Copperopolis Post Office.

References

Populated places in Pinal County, Arizona